Tangra Mountains (in Bulgarian Тангра планина, 'Tangra planina' \'tan-gra pla-ni-'na\) form the principal mountain range of Livingston Island in the South Shetland Islands, Antarctica.  The range had been nameless until 2001, when it was named after Tangra, "the name of the ancient Bulgarian god."

The mountain is divided in three principal ridges: Friesland Ridge in the west, Levski Ridge in the centre, and Delchev Ridge in the east.

The peaks and slopes of Tangra are heavily glaciated, and drained by the glaciers Huron, Huntress, Ruen Icefall, Peshtera, Charity, Tarnovo Ice Piedmont, Prespa, Macy, Boyana, Srebarna, Magura, Dobrudzha, Ropotamo, Strandzha, Pautalia, Sopot Ice Piedmont, and Iskar.

Camp Academia in the northwestern foothills of Zograf Peak is the perfect gateway to central Tangra Mountains via Catalunyan Saddle (1260 m) to the south and Lozen Saddle (437 m) to the east.  Catalunyan Saddle was occupied by a bivouac of the Tangra 2004/05 Exploration team on 14–16 December 2004.

Friesland Ridge 

Friesland Ridge is 15.5 km long from Botev Point in the southwest to Shipka Saddle to the northeast.  The summit Mount Friesland rises to exactly 1700 m. It was accurately measured by GPS in December 2003 by the Omega Foundation expedition led by Damien Gildea, which made the second ascent of Mount Friesland.  Other main peaks are St. Boris (1699 m), Simeon (1580 m), St. Cyril (1505 m), Lyaskovets (1473 m), Presian Ridge (1456 m), St. Methodius (1180 m), Academia (1253 m), and Zograf (1011 m). First ascents: Mount Friesland by Francesc Sàbat and Jorge Enrique from Juan Carlos I Base on 30 December 1991; Lyaskovets Peak by L. Ivanov and D. Vasilev from Camp Academia on 14 December 2004; Zograf Peak by L. Ivanov from Camp Academia on 31 December 2004; Simeon Peak by D. Boyanov, N. Petkov and N. Hazarbasanov from Huntress Glacier on 15 January 2017; and St. Boris Peak by D. Boyanov and N. Petkov from Camp Academia area on 22 December 2016.

Levski Ridge 

Levski Ridge is 8 km long between Shipka Saddle to the west and Devin Saddle to the east, and 8 km wide between Cherepish Ridge to the north and Christoff Cliff to the south.  The summit Great Needle Peak rises to 1680 m, and was first ascended and GPS-surveyed by the Bulgarian mountaineers Doychin Boyanov, Nikolay Petkov and Aleksander Shopov on 8 January 2015. Other main peaks are Levski (1430 m), St. Ivan Rilski Col (1350 m), Helmet (1254 m), Serdica (1200 m), Vihren (1150 m), Ongal (1149 m), and Plovdiv (1040 m). Other first ascents: Ongal Peak and Komini Peak (774 m) by L. Ivanov from Camp Academia on 21 December 2004, and Plana Peak by D. Boyanov, N. Petkov and A. Shopov on 8 January 2015.

Delchev Ridge 

Delchev Ridge is 10 km long between Devin Saddle to the west and Renier Point to the east.  The summit Delchev Peak rises to 940 m, other main peaks are Ruse (800 m), Asen (800 m), Peter (800 m), Kuber (770 m), Elena (700 m), Spartacus (650 m), Yavorov (640 m), and Paisiy (550 m).

Mapping 
British mapping of the mountains in 1968, Spanish mapping in 1991, Omega Foundation mapping in 2004, Bulgarian mapping in 2005 and 2009 from topographic surveys in 1995/96 and 2004/05.
 S. Soccol, D. Gildea and J. Bath. Livingston Island, Antarctica. Scale 1:100000 satellite map. The Omega Foundation, USA, 2004.
 L.L. Ivanov et al. Antarctica: Livingston Island and Greenwich Island, South Shetland Islands (from English Strait to Morton Strait, with illustrations and ice-cover distribution). Scale 1:100000 topographic map. Sofia: Antarctic Place-names Commission of Bulgaria, 2005.
 L.L. Ivanov. Antarctica: Livingston Island and Greenwich, Robert, Snow and Smith Islands. Scale 1:120000 topographic map. Troyan: Manfred Wörner Foundation, 2010.  (First edition 2009. )
 L.L. Ivanov. Antarctica: Livingston Island and Smith Island. Scale 1:100000 topographic map. Manfred Wörner Foundation, 2017. 
 A. Kamburov and L. Ivanov. Bowles Ridge and Central Tangra Mountains: Livingston Island, Antarctica. Scale 1:25000 map. Sofia: Manfred Wörner Foundation, 2023.

See also 
 Geographical features on Livingston Island
 Antarctic Place-names Commission
 St. Kliment Ohridski Base
 Camp Academia
 Tangra 2004/05 Expedition
 Bansko Peak

References

Notes

Sources
 J. Stewart. Antarctica: An Encyclopedia. Jefferson, N.C. and London: McFarland, 2011. 1771 pp.  
 D. Gildea. 2003 – Omega Livingston Island GPS Expedition. Antarctic Mountains: Climbing in Antarctica.
 Antarctica: Livingston Island. Climb Magazine, Issue 14. Kettering, UK, April 2006. pp. 89–91
 L. Ivanov. Livingston Island: Tangra Mountains, Komini Peak, west slope new rock route; Lyaskovets Peak, first ascent; Zograf Peak, first ascent; Vidin Heights, Melnik Peak, Melnik Ridge, first ascent. The American Alpine Journal, 2005. pp. 312–315
 L. Ivanov. General Geography and History of Livingston Island. In: Bulgarian Antarctic Research: A Synthesis. Eds. C. Pimpirev and N. Chipev. Sofia: St. Kliment Ohridski University Press, 2015. pp. 17–28. 
 D. Gildea. Mountaineering in Antarctica: complete guide: Travel guide. Primento and Editions Nevicata, 2015.

External links 

 Bulgarian Antarctic Gazetteer. Antarctic Place-names Commission. (details in Bulgarian, basic data in English)
 Tangra 2004/05 Expedition
 Expedition Omega Livingston 2003. The Omega Foundation, USA, 2003.
 Antarctic Mountains: Climbing in Antarctica
 Tangra Mountains. Copernix satellite image

 
Bulgaria and the Antarctic
Mountain ranges of Antarctica